St. Paul is a provincial electoral division in the Canadian province of Manitoba. It was created by electoral redistribution in 2008 mostly out of the old Springfield riding.

Communities in the riding include the Rural Municipality of East St. Paul, West St. Paul, Oakbank, and Dugald. The 2006 census population was 19,995.

List of provincial representatives

Electoral results

2011 general election

2016 general election

References

St. Paul